The 2014–15 Stanford Cardinal women's basketball team will represent Stanford University during the 2014–15 NCAA Division I women's basketball season. The Cardinal, led by twenty-ninth year head coach Tara VanDerveer, played their home games at the Maples Pavilion and were a members of the Pac-12 Conference. They finished the season 26–10, 13–5 in Pac-12 play to finish in a tie for third place. They won the Pac-12 women's tournament to earn an automatic trip to the NCAA women's tournament where they defeated Cal State Northridge in the first round, Oklahoma in the second round before losing to Notre Dame in the sweet sixteen.

Previous season

The Stanford Cardinal finished the 2013-14 season with an overall record of 33–4, with a record of 17–1 in the Pac-12 regular season to win their 24th Pac-12 regular season title. In the 2014 Pac-12 Tournament, the Cardinal were defeated by USC, 72–68 in the semifinals. They were invited to the 2014 NCAA Division I women's basketball tournament, making their 27th straight appearance. They lost in the final for to the 2014 NCAA Division I women's basketball tournament champion to Connecticut, 75-56.

Off Season

Departures

2014 Recruiting Class

Roster

Schedule

|-
!colspan=9 style="background:#8C1515; color:white;"| Exhibition

|-
!colspan=9 style="background:#8C1515; color:white;"| Non-conference regular season

|-
!colspan=9 style="background:#8C1515; color:white;"| Pac-12 Regular Season

|-
!colspan=9 style="background:#8C1515;"| Pac-12 Women's Tournament

|-
!colspan=9 style="background:#8C1515;"| NCAA Women's Tournament

Rankings

See also
 2014–15 Stanford Cardinal men's basketball team

References

Stanford Cardinal women's basketball seasons
Stanford